In the Times of Don Porfirio (Spanish:En tiempos de Don Porfirio) is a 1939 Mexican musical film directed by Juan Bustillo Oro and starring Fernando Soler, Marina Tamayo, Emilio Tuero and Joaquín Pardavé. The film, adapted from a novel, nostalgically portrays the government of General and President Porfirio Díaz, who is played by Antonio R. Frausto, who played him in several films. The film was the highest-grossing Mexican film of the year.

Cast
 Fernando Soler as don Francisco  
 Marina Tamayo as Carmen  
 Emilio Tuero as Fernando Villanueva  
 Joaquín Pardavé as don Rodrigo  
 Dolores Camarillo as Chole 
 Aurora Walker as doña Carlota  
 Agustín Isunza as Estebán  
 Lucha María Ávila as Carmen, niña 
 Victoria Argota as doña Etelvina  
 Conchita Gentil Arcos as doña Julia  
 Humberto Rodríguez 
 Manuel Noriega 
 Armando Velasco as don Germán 
 Gerardo del Castillo 
 Emilio Romero 
 Adolfo Bernáldez 
 Manuel Pozos as don Luis 
 Max Langler as don Fulgencio  
 Manuel Zoca
 Julio Ahuet 
 Roberto Cañedo as Extra 
 Antonio R. Frausto as Porfirio Díaz  
 José Elías Moreno as Invitado a baile  
 Aurora Ruiz as Sirvienta

Release and reception
The film was the highest-grossing Mexican film in its year of release at the box office. The author Carl J. Mora wrote that "the nostalgia it evoked of a simpler and more peaceful epoch could also be interpreted as a rejection by the middle class of the more socialistic aspects of the Revolution. The appearance in the film of such popular actors as Fernando Soler, the Spanish immigrant Emilio Tuero, and the fine comic actor Joaquín Pardavé were also potent factors in the movie's success.
In their book Culture and Customs of Mexico - Peter Standish and Steven M. Bell describe the film as a "political extreme", in that the "film's nostalgia for the stable hierarchies of pre-Revolutionary days arguably provided some comfort to the sectors of society that felt threatened by the Cardenas government's land redistribution and nationalization programmes". Colin Gunckel, Jan-Christopher Horak and Lisa Jarvinen described the film as a "political revista that utilized zarzuela melodies popular during the Porfiriato". Jacqueline Avila compared it to Mexico de mis recuerdos (1944), describing them as "two noteworthy films that intertwine musical performances in the narratives and expose the social contradictions of Porfirian culture, particularly concerning women's roles".

References

Bibliography 
 Segre, Erica. Intersected Identities: Strategies of Visualisation in Nineteenth- and Twentieth-century Mexican Culture. Berghahn Books, 2007.

External links 
 

1939 films
1930s historical musical films
Mexican historical musical films
1930s Spanish-language films
Films set in the 19th century
Films directed by Juan Bustillo Oro
Mexican black-and-white films